Dalas (also known as Dalsaq) is a village in Jarahi Rural District, in the Central District of Mahshahr County, Khuzestan Province, Iran. At the 2006 census, its population was 45, in 7 families.

References 

Populated places in Mahshahr County